Joseph Morris Bates (22 May 1864 – 6 September 1905), usually known as Morris Bates, was an English footballer.

Bates first played as an amateur for Nottingham Forest, before moving south to London to take up work at the Royal Arsenal in Woolwich (along with former teammate Fred Beardsley). There, he met several other keen football fans, including Jack Humble and David Danskin, and together they formed Dial Square Football Club in 1886; the club were soon renamed Royal Arsenal, and are today known simply as Arsenal. Bates continued to officiate as an umpire at some of Forest's games; with Fred Beardsley, he was responsible for obtaining a set of red kit from their old club Forest, giving Arsenal the colours they still wear.

Bates played 73 first-team matches for Royal Arsenal, mainly as a full-back, in the FA Cup (including the Gunners' very first FA Cup tie, against Lyndhurst on 5 October 1889) and various regional competitions. Bates went on to become Arsenal's captain and earned the nickname "The Iron Man", with a reputation for his powerful heading of the ball, in an era when footballs were far heavier and more dangerous to head than they are now. He skippered Arsenal to their first trophy wins – the Kent Senior Cup and London Charity Cup in 1890.

Bates was 36 by the time of the cup wins and decided he was getting too old for the game; he quit playing for the Royal Arsenal first team in the summer of 1890. Unlike Beardsley or Danskin, he did not maintain his association with the club after retiring, as no mention of him is made in subsequent records. He continued to work at the Royal Arsenal, specialising in Maxim guns, until his death from tuberculosis at 41.

Footnotes

References

External links 
Player profile - 11v11

1864 births
1905 deaths
English footballers
Association football fullbacks
Nottingham Forest F.C. players
Arsenal F.C. players
20th-century deaths from tuberculosis
Tuberculosis deaths in England